The First Battle of Cabin Creek took place on July 1 through July 2, 1863, in Mayes County, Oklahoma during the American Civil War.  The Confederate forces under Colonel Stand Watie attempted to ambush a Union supply convoy led by Colonel James Monroe Williams.  Williams was alerted to the attack and, despite the waters of the creek being swelled by rain, made a successful attack upon the entrenched Confederate position and forced them to flee. The raid by a Confederate Army detachment on a Union Army supply train bound for Fort Gibson in July 1863 failed to stop the Union detachment, which enabled the Union to succeed in winning the Battle of Honey Springs later that month. The battle was the first in which African American troops fought side-by-side with their white comrades.

Two Civil War military engagements were fought at the Cabin Creek battlefield in the Cherokee Nation within Indian Territory.  The location was where the Texas Road crossed Cabin Creek, near the present-day town of Big Cabin, Oklahoma. Both the First and Second Battles of Cabin Creek were launched by the Confederate Army to disrupt Union Army supply trains.

The second engagement, in September, 1864, again a Confederate raid on a Union supply train, resulted in the Confederates capturing over a million dollars worth of mules, wagons and supplies. However, this was too late to have a strategic impact on the outcome of the war. Confederate General Stand Watie led the attackers during both raids.

Background 

Colonel James M. Williams had charge of the escort of a Union supply train from Fort Scott, Kansas to Fort Gibson, Oklahoma (which was then in Indian Territory).  His force marched along the Texas Road and consisted of detachments of the 2nd Colorado Infantry Regiment, 3rd Wisconsin Volunteer Cavalry Regiment, 6th Regiment Kansas Volunteer Cavalry, 9th Regiment Kansas Volunteer Cavalry, 3rd Regiment, Indian Home Guard, 1st Kansas Colored Infantry and the 2nd Kansas Artillery.

Confederate Colonel Stand Watie had intended to ambush Williams' convoy and had 1,600 to 1,800 men lying in wait at the Cabin Creek crossing.  Watie had counted on 1,500 additional men, led by Brigadier General William L. Cabell to strengthen his force prior to the attack but Cabell's troops were delayed by high waters on the Grand River.

Battle 
Williams arrived at the crossing on 1 July and learned of the intentions of Watie's force from captured Confederate soldiers.   Watie's battle line extended around one mile either side of the crossing in trenches dug into the brush lining the creek.  Owing to the unusually high water level in the creek, which reached above shoulder height, Williams chose to delay his attack on the Confederates until the following day and corralled his wagons defensively on a nearby prairie.

Williams ordered a half-hour artillery bombardment before launching an assault with the Third Indian Home Guard.  They failed to make it across the now waist-deep creek, pushed back by heavy Confederate fire, and so the Ninth Kansas Cavalry were ordered to charge under the covering fire of the 1st Kansas Colored Infantry.   With the cavalry having gained a bridgehead across the creek, Williams led the men of his own regiment, the 1st Kansas Colored Infantry, in a headlong charge across the stream and into the brush. This forced the Confederates back and Williams pursued them for a quarter of a mile as they attempted to rally in a clearing.  Williams then led his convoy to successfully resupply Fort Gibson.  Confederate casualties amounted to 65 men killed with the Union Army suffering between 3 and 23 dead with 30 wounded.

Impact 
The action made possible the continuation of a Union force in the Indian territory, allowing the later victories at Honey Springs and Fort Smith.  Soon after the battle the Union established defensive outposts along the Texas Road, including one at the Cabin Creek crossing.  The battle has the distinction of being the first in which African American soldiers (the 1st Kansas Colored Infantry) fought alongside white troops.  A monument to the 1st Kansas Colored Infantry was erected on the battlefield on 7 July 2007.

Notes

References

External links
 Encyclopedia of Oklahoma History and Culture – Cabin Creek, Battle of

Cabin Creek
Cabin Creek
Mayes County, Oklahoma
Cabin Creek
Cabin Creek
Protected areas of Mayes County, Oklahoma
July 1863 events